Martnália Mendonça Ferreira, known as Mart'nália (Rio de Janeiro, September 7, 1965) is a Brazilian singer, songwriter, percussionist and actress.

Career
Daughter of sambista Martinho da Vila and singer Analia Mendonca (her name is a blend of parents' names), the singer was born in Vila Isabel, North Zone of Rio de Janeiro. Since childhood she was surrounded by music.

She began her professional career at age 16, doing backing vocals for her father beside her sister, Analimar. In the mid 1990s, she began making presentations on the circuit of bars, nightclubs and theaters in Rio de Janeiro, which culminated in the release of her samba album Minha cara. Since 1994, she joined the group Batacotô, whose percussionist was Ivan Lins.

Mart'nália had the privilege of becoming sponsored by big names of Brazilian popular music thanks to her father. Caetano Veloso was the artistic director of her Pé de meu samba and composed the title track, and Maria Bethânia produced Menino do Rio From these two albums, Mart'nália began to attract greater media attention and to have shows throughout the country, paving the way for international tours through Europe and Africa.

In 2015, her album Em Samba! Ao vivo was nominated for the 16th Latin Grammy Awards in the Best Samba/Pagode Album category. In 2017, another album of hers, Misturado, was nominated in the same category of the 2017 edition, and this time it won. In 2019, she was nominated for a third time in that category, this time for the album Mart'nalia Canta Vinicius de Moraes.

Personal life
Mart'nália is a lesbian.

Discography

Notes

20th-century Brazilian women singers
21st-century Brazilian women singers
Living people
1965 births
Lesbian singers
Brazilian lesbian musicians
Brazilian LGBT singers
Musicians from Rio de Janeiro (city)
Latin Grammy Award winners
Women in Latin music
LGBT people in Latin music